Himantolophus danae is a species of footballfish, a type of anglerfish. It is endemic to the west central Pacific Ocean.

References

Himantolophidae
Deep sea fish
Fish described in 1932
Taxa named by Charles Tate Regan
Taxa named by Ethelwynn Trewavas